Stennett may refer to:

Stennett, Iowa, U.S., unincorporated community
Stennett (surname), includes a list of people with the surname
Stennett H. Brooks, pastor

See also
Stinnett (disambiguation)